Julian Cannonball Adderley and Strings is the third album by jazz saxophonist Cannonball Adderley, and his second released on the EmArcy label, and features Adderley with an orchestra directed by Richard Hayman.

Reception
The Allmusic review by Stewart Mason states "Adderley himself plays beautifully, showing off his typically excellent soloing throughout... barring a few minor missteps, all of Julian Cannonball Adderley and Strings is well worth hearing".

Track listing
 "I Cover the Waterfront" (Johnny Green, Edward Heyman) - 2:27  
 "A Foggy Day" (George Gershwin, Ira Gershwin) - 2:42  
 "The Surrey With the Fringe on Top" (Oscar Hammerstein II, Richard Rodgers) - 2:33  
 "Two Sleepy People" (Hoagy Carmichael, Frank Loesser) - 3:01  
 "I'll Never Stop Loving You" (Nicholas Brodszky, Sammy Cahn) - 2:41  
 "(I'm Afraid) The Masquerade Is Over" (Herbert Magidson, Allie Wrubel) - 3:11  
 "I've Never Been in Love Before" (Loesser) - 2:20  
 "Lonely Dreams" (Julius Gubenko) - 2:30  
 "Falling in Love With Love" (Lorenz Hart, Richard Rodgers) - 2:33  
 "Street of Dreams" (Sam M. Lewis, Victor Young) - 2:14  
 "Polka Dots and Moonbeams" (Johnny Burke, Jimmy Van Heusen) - 3:04  
 "You Are Too Beautiful" (Hart, Rodgers) - 2:55  
Recorded in New York City on October 27 (tracks 9-12) & October 28 (tracks 1-8), 1955

Personnel
Cannonball Adderley - alto saxophone
Richard Hayman – musical director 
Bill Russo - arranger
Unidentified Strings

References

1955 albums
EmArcy Records albums
Cannonball Adderley albums
Albums arranged by Bill Russo